is a josei manga by Akemi Yoshimura. It was serialized in Shogakukan's Petit Comic between 1992 and 1998. The series received the Shogakukan Manga Award for shōjo in 1994.

Plot
Yuri Makurano is an unattractive girl who learns her mother is a famous actress named Shoko Hanai following her grandmother's death. Yuri begins to live with her mother's family which consists of three children named Sumire, Aoi, and Fuyo Hanatashiki. Yuri is treated as a maid at the household, eventually bonding with the family and builds up unrequited feelings for Sumire. Later, she comes to learn the only blood relation she has to the family is Aoi, her half brother.

Characters

Yuri is an unattractive girl whose only talent is housekeeping. She is initially believed to be Ichiro Makurano and Shoko Hanai's daughter. Eventually, she learns her parents were the Kusinagis, Ichiro's friends who died after a false double suicide; this makes her Aoi's half sibling. She admired Sumire since she saw his debut acting as a child. In the Taiwanese drama, she is portrayed by Ella Chen.

Sumire is the middle child and was born to Shoko Hanai and her second husband, an American film producer. He wears sunglasses most of the time to hide his blue eyes due to the attention he receives. Sumire was engaged to a girl named Seri; her death caused him severe angst where he attempted suicide multiple times. Due to Yuri's influence, he begins to recover from her death.

Aoi is the youngest child and was born to Shoko Hanai and Kusanagi, a man whom she had an affair with. He joined the Hanatashiki family when he was a preteen, resulting in him falling in love with Sumire; as a result, Aoi grows his hair out to appear more feminine. When Yuri joins the family, he begins to shift his love towards her.

Fuyo is the oldest child and was born to Shoko Hanai and her first husband. She excelled at housekeeping as she wanted to become a good wife. She was once married but divorced due to her husband siding with her abusive step mother. Since then, she has been disdained to housekeeping and spends most of her time watching movies. Due to her deductive abilities, she realizes Yuri's relationship to the family.

When Ichiro became stricken with disease, he ended his relationship with Shoko by claiming Yuri was his daughter to spare her the suffering, causing Shoko lose her trust in men. Afterwards, she adopts a loose lifestyle full of parties and men; she becomes more calm after learning the truth about Ichiro and Yuri.

Release
Bara no Tame ni is authored by Akemi Yoshimura and was serialized in Shogakukan's Petit Comic between 1992 and 1998. It was compiled into sixteen tankōbon volumes released between September 1992 to January 1998. The shinsōban contained nine volumes released between October 2000 to February 2001. The series won a Shogakukan Manga Award for shōjo in 1994.

Volume list

Live-action drama adaption

The manga was adapted into a Taiwanese drama titled The Rose and directed by Chu Yu-ning. It was broadcast on Taiwan Television between March to November 2003. The series received a Golden Bell Award in 2004.

References

External links

1992 manga
1998 comics endings
Josei manga
Manga adapted into television series
Romance anime and manga
Winners of the Shogakukan Manga Award for shōjo manga
Shogakukan manga